Rainbach may refer to:
Rainbach im Mühlkreis, a municipality in the district of Freistadt, Upper Austria, Austria
Rainbach im Innkreis, a municipality in the district of Schärding, Upper Austria, Austria.